Parappanangadi Railway Station is at the heart of the Parappanangadi town in Kerala, India, located 26 km away from Malappuram. It is one of the oldest railway stations in Kerala. This railway station was a part of the first rail route (Tirur-Beypore) in Kerala.  The station code for Parappanangadi is set by Indian Railway is PGI which can be used for various purposes including online reservation.

References

External links 

 

 Remaining Date for Parappanangadi Municipality Election 2020

Railway stations in Malappuram district
Palakkad railway division